From 1950 to 1979, at least 34 tropical or subtropical cyclones affected the U.S. state of Texas. According to David Roth of the Hydrometeorological Prediction Center, a tropical cyclone makes landfall along the coastline about three times every four years, and on any  segment of the coastline a hurricane makes landfall about once every six years.

During this period, the most active month for storms affecting Texas is September, with twelve total storms, while no recorded storms have affected Texas during the months of November through May. While the most intense storms in terms of barometric pressure are both Hurricane Carla in 1961 and Hurricane Beulah in 1967, Carla caused the most fatalities and damages, with $325 million in damages and 46 deaths. The first storm to impact the state during the period was Tropical Storm How in October 1950, with the latest being Tropical Depression Twenty in September 1979. In terms of wind speed, Hurricane Carla is the strongest storm to affect the state, producing maximum sustained winds equivalent to  status on the Saffir–Simpson hurricane scale.

In the 1950s, five tropical cyclones made landfall on Texas as hurricanes. Starting in 1955, hurricanes that caused substantial damage to any country could have their name retired from the list of names for the Atlantic basin. Hurricane Audrey, the most destructive Texas hurricane during the 1950s, was the first hurricane to impact Texas to have its name retired. While the 1960s only featured six tropical cyclones making landfall on Texas, Hurricane Carla and Hurricane Beulah, both destructive Category 5s, made landfall as Category 4 hurricanes during the decade. Both hurricanes were subsequently retired. In the 1970s, five hurricanes affected Texas. Hurricane Celia made landfall as a major hurricane in 1970, causing $1.8 billion in damages.

1950–1954

Damage is reported as far north as Port Aransas. Sections of highway on North Padre Island are washed away.
June 25, 1954 – The first Hurricane Alice of 1954 makes landfall south of Brownsville as a hurricane. Damage on the coast close to where Alice made landfall remained minimal. However, the resulting flood caused by the remnants of Alice were considered a 1 in 2000 year event. A bridge on the Pecos River collapsed due to the heavy rains. In the town of Ozona alone, the floods caused $2 million in damages.
July 29, 1954 – Tropical Storm Barbara makes landfall on Vermilion Bay before moving into Texas as a tropical depression, bringing rain and gusty winds.
October 3, 1954 – An unnumbered tropical depression makes landfall in the Brownsville area, bringing rough seas. The storm causes  of rain in Brownsville. Notably, on October 5, when the system was centered over the Big Bend region, a rocket launched by the United States Navy in White Sands, New Mexico, took an unintended photograph of the depression from an altitude of about 100 miles (160 km), which became the first such large-scale image of a tropical cyclone.

1955–1959

August 2, 1955 – Tropical Storm Brenda makes landfall near New Orleans, Louisiana and moves westward into eastern portions of Texas in early August. Prior to the storm, storm warnings are issued for the entire Gulf Coast from Galveston to the Mississippi River. Small craft advisories are issued for coastal areas extending down to Brownsville.
Vacationers evacuate Padre Island in preparation for the storm. In Oso Bay, storm surge is reported to have reached  in height. Two ships off the Texas coast are feared to have been damaged during the storm. The shrimp boat Mary Ellen was thought to have been beached on Padre Island, and the Don II went missing off Port Aransas. The United States Coast Guard patrols the coast to rescue stranded people and respond to emergency calls, as well as search for the missing ships. A secondary low-pressure area formed on September 7 near Gladys. The circulation area was known as Glasscock, after an offshore oil platform that reported  winds during the storm. It was later speculated that the system was a separate tropical storm. Gladys causes $400,000 in damages across South Texas.
June 13, 1956 – An unnamed tropical storm makes landfall in southeastern Louisiana, resulting in heavy rains in eastern Texas.
While most of the storm's impact occurs in Louisiana, Audrey still brings strong winds to far eastern Texas. Port Arthur records a gust of  due to the hurricane. Winds also knock down power lines and communication lines. Many trees are also uprooted due to the strong winds. Heavy rains also set a daily rainfall record at Jefferson County Airport, recording  in a 24-hour period. The strong waves wash out areas of Mustang Island and Packery Channel. Multiple ships, including a tanker, become beached off of Corpus Christi as a result of the wave action associated with the hurricane. Nine deaths in Texas result from Audrey, seven of which are attributed to the sinking of a fishing boat offshore of Galveston. Damages from Hurricane Audrey in Texas amount to $8 million.
In Livingston, the rains are considered the worst since 1929. Two highways near the city are closed due to high water, and the town suffers from subsequent water damage. In other areas of East Texas, cotton and sorghum crops benefit from the rain.
At South Padre Island tides reach . Much of the damage from Alma is due to heavy rains, which cause substantial crop and structural damage. One person drowns off Galveston due to Alma.
In preparation for the storm 117 aircraft at Moore Air Base are moved to the James Connally Air Force Base. In addition the aircraft carrier  is evacuated out of Corpus Christi. Just before the storm, three small communities, including Port Aransas, are evacuated. Texas State Highway 44 is rendered nearly impassable due to the rains. Only one death occurs due to Ella offshore.
No deaths are reported, but a person reportedly goes missing in Texas City. The shrimp boat Hope, with a crew of three, is beached on a sand bar, but the coast guard was unable to reach the ship and its occupants. A daily rainfall record is set by Debra in Beaumont, where  of rain was reported in a day. In Texas City, residences and buildings are damaged by the storm. In Brazoria County, crop damage totals to at least $100,000 in the county alone. Damages from Debra are estimated to have reached $6.7 million.

1960–1964

The storm looped over southern Texas, dumping heavy rain over the area. It moved slowly northward, and eventually dissipated over Illinois. Though weak, the storm caused $3.6 million in damage (1960 dollars) and 15 deaths.
September 11, 1961 – Hurricane Carla made landfall near Port Lavaca as a Category 4 hurricane. With an estimated central pressure of 931 mb at landfall, Carla was one of the largest and most intense hurricanes to strike the United States, and the strongest ever to hit Texas. Carla killed 31 people in Texas. The low death toll is credited to what was then the largest peacetime evacuation in United States history up until that time. One half million residents headed inland from exposed coastal areas. Carla caused a total of $325 million in damage.
September 17, 1963 – Tropical Storm Cindy in 1963 made landfall on High Island, Texas. Cindy brought heavy rain to southeast Texas as it drifted southwestward over the state. The hurricane dissipated after causing $12.5 million in damage and three deaths.
August 7, 1964 – Tropical Storm Abby the very next year hit Matagorda, Texas as a  tropical storm, dissipating the following day. Abby was a small system; its complete circulation at the surface was less than 100 miles (160 km) in diameter. Because of this, Abby caused only $750,000 in damage, most of it from crop damage.

1965–1969
 
The lower Rio Grande Valley, the four county region that comprises deep south Texas, was inundated with torrential rains and strong winds. Gusts of over 100 MPH were recorded as far inland as the towns of McAllen, Edinburg, Mission, and Pharr, some fifty miles from the gulf coast. Beulah was a record tornado-producer (a record that would stand until 2004) that destroyed homes, commercial property, and inflicted serious damage on the region's agricultural industry. The Rio Grande Valley's citrus industry, based on cultivation of the famous "Ruby Red" grapefruit, was particularly hard hit. Padre Island, just off the Texas gulf coast, suffered significant devastation, and the island's sensitive ecosystem was altered by the storm. Within a 36-hour period it dropped almost 30 inches of rain in Beeville, Texas. Hurricane Beulah caused an estimated $1.1 billion (in 2000 dollars) in damage. Sources report 58–59 deaths from the storm.
July 23, 1968 – In 1968, Tropical Storm Candy moved inland over southeast Texas, causing heavy flooding, crop damage, and tornadoes.

1970–1974

August 3, 1970 – Hurricane Celia of 1970 made landfall in Texas. Celia killed 20 due to extreme gusts, and caused hundreds of millions of dollars in damage. The storm produced microbursts, which are rare in a tropical cyclone. The windbursts caused heavy damage across the city. In Corpus Christi, Texas, one person was reported dead with over 460 others injured. Damage accumulated was about $1.8 billion. In Port O'Connor, Texas, the storm broke several wind gauges and killed four people. Along the coast, boats were pushed ashore.
September 16, 1970 – Later that year, Tropical Storm Felice made landfall in Texas.
September 15, 1971 – Hurricane Edith caused tides up to 6' in Sabine Pass in 1971; soon afterwards, Hurricane Fern made landfall between Freeport, Texas and Matagorda, Texas as a tropical storm. Damage was minimal.
September 4, 1973 – Tropical Storm Delia in 1973 made its first landfall on the Southeast Texas coast near Freeport, and after a loop it hit Freeport again a few days later. This became the first known tropical cyclone to hit the same area twice. Six days later, Tropical Depression Six stalled over the Freeport, Texas area from the 10th to the 12th, bringing more rain to coastal areas that had already been saturated by Tropical Storm Delia. The depression caused $15 million more in crop damages.
September 9, 1974 – In 1974, Hurricane Carmen made landfall in Louisiana producing heavy rainfall throughout Eastern Texas.

1975–1979

September 22, 1977 – Hurricane Anita of 1977 made medium rainfall throughout the eastern Texas coast.
August 1, 1978 – Tropical Storm Amelia (1978), with flooding rains, led to the deaths of 30 people in Texas in late July 1978. Later that year, Tropical Storm Debra made landfall halfway between Lake Charles, Louisiana and Beaumont, Texas, causing minimal damage.
July 24, 1979 – From July 24–27, 1979, Tropical Storm Claudette produced torrential rains in both Texas and Louisiana when it made landfall. The highest total was reported in Alvin, Texas where  of rain fell. This remains the twenty-four-hour rainfall record for any location in the United States.
September 1, 1979 – Later in 1979, Tropical Storm Elena made landfall near Sargent, Texas as a weak tropical storm, rapidly deteriorating as it moved inland. It caused less than $10 million in damage but managed to kill two people in floods.
September 20, 1979 – Again in 1979, Tropical Depression Twenty produced rainfall in Louisiana and Texas after hitting Brownsville.

Monthly statistics

Deadly storms
The following is a list of hurricanes, tropical storms, and tropical depressions with known deaths in the state.

See also
List of Texas hurricanes (pre-1900)
List of Texas hurricanes (1980–present)
List of wettest known tropical cyclones affecting Texas

Notes

References

 List 1950
Lists of tropical cyclones in the United States
Hurricanes (1950-79)